Springer's blenny may refer to the following fish species:
 Cirripectes springeri
Scartella springeri
 Starksia springeri